The University of Asia and the Pacific (UA&P; Filipino: Pamantasan ng Asya at Pasipiko) is a private university in the Philippines. It traces its beginnings to the Center for Research and Communication (CRC), which was established on August 15, 1967, as a private think-tank that conducted economic and social research and offered graduate courses in economics.

The spiritual and doctrinal formation given in the university is entrusted to Opus Dei, a  Personal prelature of the Catholic Church.

History

On August 15, 1967,  a non-profit private research center was formally established by economists Dr. Bernardo Villegas and Dr. Jesus P. Estanislao, who would later be appointed Finance Secretary during the presidency of Corazon Aquino.  It served as a "think tank" for private sector businesses and a provider of economics training programs.

After this formal establishment, CRC set up its offices in a rented facility along Jorge Bocobo Street in Malate, Manila. Prior to this, the CRC's first office was at offices of the United Coconut Authority of the Philippines, a private organization of coconut producers, then headed by Ambassador Jose V. Romero Jr. who served as its executive director.

The transformation of CRC into a university was inspired by a private meeting in Mexico between the founder of Opus Dei, Msgr. Josemaría Escrivá, and the founders of CRC in 1970. The meeting encouraged Estanislao and Villegas to expand the institution's horizons internationally, which resulted to  its first graduate program, the Masters in Industrial Economics.

CRC then moved to its current campus in Ortigas Center, Pasig, with established formal and informal programs in 1982.  A year later, the Center for Food and Agribusiness was established.  Then in 1987, CRC was reminded by Bishop Álvaro del Portillo to establish a university.  This resulted to the Institute of Development Education; the foundation for the School of Education.

On March 19, 1989, the College of Arts and Sciences was established and admitted its first batch of 158 college students. The center finally gained its university status on June 26, 1995, with Dr. Estanislao as its first University President and Fr. Ramon Lopez, the regional Vicar of Opus Dei for Asia, as its Vice Grand Chancellor.

Timeline 
1996
The School of Management was founded with Dr. Jose Rene C. Gayo as the Founding Dean.

1997
Mario D. Camacho installed as second University President.

1998
Visit by the University Grand Chancellor, Bishop Javier Echevarria, the Prelate of Opus Dei.

2000
Dean of the College of Arts and Sciences, Dr. Jose Maria Mariano installed as Third University President.

2005
The Marketing Communication Effectiveness Awards (now the Tambuli Awards) launched.

2008
Visit by UA&P Grand Chancellor, Bishop Javier Echevarria.

2010
School of Sciences and Engineering was established; BS Applied Mathematics program was offered
Tambuli Awards made an annual event, to further its advocacy of values in integrated marketing communications.

2013
School of Law and Governance was established which replaced the Institute of Political Economy.

2016
UA&P, in pursuance to the K-12 program of DepEd, offers the 6-Year Integrated University Program, which consists of 2 years of General Education, 2.5 years of a Bachelor's degree program and 1.5 years of a Masters program.
BS Accountancy program is now being offered.

2017
UA&P celebrated its 50th Golden year anniversary

Administration and organization 

The university is made up of a college offering liberal arts courses as core curriculum and seven schools of varied specializations.

A Board of Trustees, chaired by Placido Mapa Jr., takes care of the UA&P Foundation, Inc. Under it is the Management Committee, presided by University President Jose Maria Mariano, which is the university's governing body. It was formed to steer the university in the path set out for it. It makes sure that all plans, activities and projects undertaken advance the mission, goals and values of the university.

Campus

Ortigas Campus 
The Ortigas Campus has 5 buildings: Administration & Library Building (ALB), College of Arts and Sciences (CAS), Development Communications Building (DCB), APEC Communications Building (ACB), Parking and Sports Building (PSB) and 1 residential building.

Academic programs 
The university offers 15 undergraduate degrees and 11 graduate degrees.  It also offers 2 fast-track Master's programs: 5-Year Program (5YP), which is offered to incoming College (Freshman) students that allows them to earn a master's degree in just 5 years; and 6-Year Integrated Program (6YP), which is offered to incoming Junior College (Senior High School) students that allows them to earn a master's degree in just 6 years.

UA&P's academic programs operate on a semester calendar beginning in early August and ending in mid-May.  Since 1998, students are graded in increments of 0.25, from 3.50(failing grade) to 1.00. Undergraduate students and students under the fast-track Master's program may graduate with Latin honors depending on their graduating GWA.  For students of standalone graduate programs, they may graduate with High Distinction or with Distinction.

Student life

Student Government 
The College of Arts and Sciences Student Executive Board is the executive office with the largest scope of functions and student body.

The two other student government branches in UA&P are dedicated in serving students in the Entrepreneurial Management and Information Technology programs.

As of 2012, the SEB has been called the USG (University Student Government).

Student organizations 
Kultura (Filipino term for "culture") is an arts center based in the university that organizes arts galleries and exhibitions, theater performances and concerts. It also moderates student-led arts organizations such as Dulaang ROC, Creative Writers' Guild, I-SA Dance Crew, ViARE and the UA&P Chorale to name a few.

The Office of Student Affairs' civics desk holds the annual youth conference Civitas Asia and the BIGGKAS project which extends tutorial sessions to local public schools. The desk also supports student organizations with socio-civic aims and activities.

Virtus is the UA&P Competition League, an association of the University's academic competing teams. It consists of FORUM: The UA&P Debate Society, Aureum: The UA&P Case Competition Pool, Odyssey: The UA&P Junior College Competition Pool, Citadel: The UA&P Investment Society, Minerva: The UA&P Public Policy Delegation, Trivium: The UA&P English Olympiad, Icarus: The UA&P STEAM Team, and the UA&P Model United Nations.

Virtus has led numerous student achievements including making UA&P the first Philippine university to win the Asian Business Case Competition @ Nanyang, Citibank APAC Treasury and Trade Solutions Case Competition, and 2022 Asian English Olympics, among other local and international events.

Athletics 
The university competes in the Men's National Collegiate Athletics Association (MNCAA) and the Women's National Collegiate Athletics Association (WNCAA). The university supports teams in basketball, futsal, volleyball, handball, tennis, badminton, swimming, arnis, taekwondo, aikido, karate, table tennis and athletics.

In December 2008, the men's futsal team won the championship cup in the MNCAA. 

In October 2009, the women's basketball and volleyball teams won the championship titles in the WNCAA.

In February 2012, the UA&P Firestarters, the university's all-female cheerdance varsity, grabbed the WNCAA cheerdance competition gold.

Notable alumni

Cayetano Paderanga Jr. - Former Director-General of the National Economic and Development Authority
Jose V. Romero Jr. - ambassador, statesman
Ralph Recto - President pro tempore of the Senate of the Philippines
Victor Yap - Governor of 2nd district of Tarlac
Alex Gonzaga - artist, television host, influencer
Abra - rapper

References

External links
Official website

 
Business schools in the Philippines
Graduate schools in the Philippines
Liberal arts colleges in the Philippines
Universities and colleges in Pasig
Educational institutions established in 1995
1995 establishments in the Philippines
Ortigas Center